Doxa is the Greek word for "belief" or "opinion", or in Christian contexts, "glory". It may also refer to:
 DOXA Documentary Film Festival
 Lake Doxa, reservoir in Corinthia, Greece
 Doxa, two destroyers of the Hellenic Navy
 Doxa S.A., Swiss watchmaker
 Nya Doxa, Swedish book publisher
 Doxa, a cave on Crete
 DOXA Magazine is a Russian online student magazine

Greek football clubs
 Doxa Desfina F.C.
 Doxa Drama F.C.
 Doxa Katokopia, Cypriot
 Doxa Kranoula F.C.
 Doxa Vyronas F.C.

See also
 
 
 Glory (disambiguation)